Sasa Radulovic (born July 31, 1978 in Zenica) is an Australian footballer who currently plays as a midfielder. He is the son of Rade Radulović, a famous Yugoslav football player.

Club career
Born in Zenica, in the former Yugoslavia, Radulovic moved to Germany aged 15 and then spent two years in the Australian NSL with Brisbane Strikers and Marconi Stallions.

References

External sources
 
 

1978 births
Living people
Sportspeople from Zenica
Serbs of Bosnia and Herzegovina
Bosnia and Herzegovina emigrants to Australia
Australian people of Serbian descent
Association football midfielders
Bosnia and Herzegovina footballers
Australian soccer players
Brisbane Strikers FC players
Marconi Stallions FC players
Rot-Weiß Oberhausen players
Rot Weiss Ahlen players
Lillestrøm SK players
FC Augsburg players
NK Čelik Zenica players
Újpest FC players
Albany Creek Excelsior FC players
National Soccer League (Australia) players
2. Bundesliga players
Eliteserien players
Nemzeti Bajnokság I players
Australian expatriate soccer players
Expatriate footballers in Norway
Australian expatriate sportspeople in Norway
Expatriate footballers in Germany
Australian expatriate sportspeople in Germany
Expatriate footballers in Hungary
Australian expatriate sportspeople in Hungary